The 2004 NCAA Division I Men's Tennis Championships were the 58th annual tournaments to determine the national champions of NCAA Division I men's singles, doubles, and team collegiate tennis in the United States.

Baylor defeated UCLA in the team championship final, 4–0, to claim their first national title.

Host sites
This year's tournaments were played at the Michael D. Case Tennis Center at the University of Tulsa in Tulsa, Oklahoma. 

The men's and women's tournaments would not be held at the same site until 2006.

See also
NCAA Division II Tennis Championships (Men, Women)
NCAA Division III Tennis Championships (Men, Women)

References

External links
List of NCAA Men's Tennis Champions

NCAA Division I tennis championships
NCAA Division I Men's Tennis Championships
NCAA Division I Men's Tennis Championships
NCAA Division I Men's Tennis Championships